Whitney Ping (born October 23, 1986) is an American table tennis player. She competed in the women's doubles event at the 2004 Summer Olympics.

References

External links
 

1986 births
Living people
American female table tennis players
Olympic table tennis players of the United States
Table tennis players at the 2004 Summer Olympics
Sportspeople from Portland, Oregon
21st-century American women